Kinnikinnick is a smoking product utilizing either the leaf or inner bark of any of the below plants, typically mixed with other plant materials, such as tobacco and/or berries.

Kinnikinnick, kinnikinic, kinnikinick, etc.  may refer to:

Plants 
 Bearberry (Arctostaphylos spp.), commonly referred to as "kinnikinick"
 Red osier dogwood (Cornus sericea), regionally referred to as "kinnikinick" in Minnesota and Wisconsin
 Silky cornel (Cornus amomum)
 Canadian bunchberry (Cornus canadensis)
 Evergreen sumac (Rhus virens)
 Littleleaf sumac (Rhus microphylla)

Toponyms 
 Kinikinik, Colorado, an unincorporated community in Colorado
 Kinikinik Lake, a lake in Alberta
 Kinikinik, Alberta
 Kinnickinnic River (Milwaukee River), a river in eastern Wisconsin, a tributary of the Milwaukee River
 Kinnickinnic River (St. Croix River), a river in western Wisconsin, a tributary of the St. Croix River
 Kinnickinnic, Wisconsin, a town in western Wisconsin named after one of the rivers
 Kinnickinnic State Park, a park in western Wisconsin
 Kinnikinick Lake, a lake in Arizona
 Kinnikinnick Creek, a stream in southern central Ohio
 Kinnikinnick, Ohio, a village in Ohio, named after the stream
 Kinnikinnick Park, a municipal park in the town of Sechelt in western Canada